Heinrigh Pieterse (born 11 January 2002) is a South African cricketer. He made his Twenty20 debut on 8 October 2021, for North West in the 2021–22 CSA Provincial T20 Knock-Out tournament. Prior to his Twenty20 debut, Pieterse had also played for the South Africa under-19 team, in a home series against Pakistan in July 2019.

References

External links
 

2002 births
Living people
South African cricketers
North West cricketers
Place of birth missing (living people)